Ninaive Oru Sangeetham is a 1987 Indian Tamil-language romantic drama film, directed by K. Rangaraj and produced by S. Greeta. The film stars Vijayakanth, Radha, Srividya and Rekha. The soundtrack is composed by Ilaiyaraaja. The film was remade in Telugu as Donga Pelli.

Plot 
Marudhu, a farmer with a big heart, lives with his elder sister Vallikannu, married to the good-for-nothing Chinnukaruppandevar, along with his niece, foster daughter, Meena. One day, Meena, accompanied by her mother, asks for an explanation to the one who deceives with his father, this one throws her off out of the house. Marudhu returns her in guaranteeing that she is from now on her partner. Chinnukaruppandevar loses all his land to the unscrupulous Bairava by playing poker. At the end of a fight with the latter, Marudhu takes advantage of this event to set the record straight to his brother-in-law. However, news of the cholera rages around. Sandhya, a doctor, who wanted to inoculate the farmers, is repulsed by Marudhu and his friends. He is taken to the police station for disorder to the public service. Sandhya returns to the village, firmly decided to continue, defying the ignorance and the inhospitality of the inhabitants. Marudhu continues putting obstacles in the way, burning the tent where she sheltered. The doctor sets to keep her cool. This is when bursts a violent thunderstorm. The remorseful Marudhu returns to look for Sandhiya to put her under cover and puts up a new tent the next day. The young woman, sensitive to all these attentions, eventually falls in love with the farmer and mutually. Marudhu learns by Gowryshankar, the sad episode, where Sandhya had to be her daughter-in-law and finally it did not come true because his son left them in the lurch at the last moment. Since the old man denied him and set Sandhya under his wing. Marudhu promises to him at this moment, when she will be his wife, to her immense happiness. But Meena surprises the lovers without their knowledge. Later, Marudhu explains to Meena and to her elder sister, the tragic past of Sandhiya and cannot thus start again, at the moment its word. Sandhya would not support a new sentimental failure. Discouraged because lover also and for a long time, from her part, Meena pretended to poison herself and asks as her last wish before dying, to be the wife of Marudhu. What realizes the farmer and discovers right after that, trickery. Trapped, he summons the assembly of the wise men of the village which decides in favour of Meena. Complaining very often of violent headaches which Meena handled with casualness, the specialists diagnose her with a brain tumor. She is condemned in the very short term. Only at the beginning, Marudhu is in the confidence, not even the concerned knows. Marudhu tries to behave "normally". He informs Sandhya who, then, does the same with the sister of Marudhu there. But in front of the misfortune which strikes them, each makes a step towards the other one. Marudhu, who did not speak anymore with her sister, becomes reconciled. Chinnukaruppandevar egotist still, metamorphoses into a good man. Marudhu fulfills all the desires of his wife Meena. At the time of giving up the ghost, he makes him understand that he likes by recognizing, by confirming that she is her wife. At the burial of Meena, Marudhu turns to Sandhya to admit that he can never love another woman so much the memory, the music of his Meena, are profoundly printed in him.

Cast 

Vijayakanth as Marudhu
Rekha as Sandhya
Radha as Meena
Srividya as Vallikannu
Radha Ravi as Bairava
Goundamani as Chinnukaruppandevar
Senthil as Gundulingham
Gandhimathi as Athachi
Kovai Sarala as Gundulingham's wife
Ravichandran as Gowrishankar (in friendly appearance)

Soundtrack 
The music was composed by Ilaiyaraaja. The lyrics were written by Gangai Amaran and by Ilaiyaraaja. The song "Aethamayya Aetham" is set to the Carnatic raga Harikambhoji.

Reception 
N. Krishnaswamy of The Indian Express wrote, "Despite lacunae in the screenplay, the invigorating visual freshness keeps things going."

References

External links 

1980s Tamil-language films
1987 films
Films directed by K. Rangaraj
Films scored by Ilaiyaraaja
Tamil films remade in other languages